Saint Odran (fl. 430) was the charioteer of Saint Patrick and the first Christian martyr in Irish history.

There are two different versions given about Odran's martyrdom. The first, in the Vita tripartita Sancti Patricii, states that on the borders of the future counties of Kildare and Offaly, the chieftain of that district, Failge Berraide, worshiped the pagan god Crom Cruach and vowed to avenge the god's destruction at Magh Slécht by killing Patrick. Odran overheard the plot, and as he and Patrick set out in the chariot to continue their journey, requested that he be allowed to hold the place of honour instead of Patrick, who granted his wish; scarcely had they set out when a lance pierced Odran's heart, who by changing places saved Patrick's life.

The second version, contained in the pseudo-historical prologue (PHP) to the Senchas Már, the High-King Lóegaire mac Néill (died 462) suggests dispatching an assassin to kill someone from Patrick's household in order to test his preaching of forgiveness. The assassin is identified as King Lóegaire's brother Nuada (or nephew (?)) in the second paragraph quoted below, it being a paraphrase of the beginning sections of the PHP.{{Refn|group="lower-alpha"|To quote Carey: "then under the heading .. it [ms. C] gives a paraphrase of our §§2-4 [i.e., of the PHP proper, in 11 sections] .. presented as  Appendix II below".}}

The cause of the Senchus [Mor] having been composed was this:—Patrick came to Erin to baptize and to disseminate religion among the Gaedhil, i.e. in the ninth year of Theodosius and in the fourth year of Laeghaire, King of Erin, son of Niall.

But the cause of the Poem having been composed was as follows:—Laeghaire ordered his people to kill a man of Patrick's people; and Laeghaire agreed to give his own award to the person who should kill the man, that he might discover whether he (Patrick) would grant forgiveness for it. And Nuada Derg, the son of Niall, the brother of Laeghaire, who was in captivity in the hands of Laeghaire, heard this, and he said that if he were released and got other rewards, he would kill one of Patrick's people. And the command of Laeghaire's cavalry was given him, and he was released from captivity, and he gave guarantee that he would fulfil his promise; and he took his lance and went towards the clerics, and hurled the lance at them and slew Odran, Patrick's charioteer.

St. Patrick then asked the Chief Ollam of Ireland, Dubhthach moccu Lughair to try the case, and this places the poet in a quandary because if he didn't impose an eric-fine this would seem an affront to Patrick, while if he did impose an eric, it would be an affront to God. However, Patrick assured him he would be inspired by God to speak what is right, and Dubhthach, after reciting the Senchus Mor as poetry, encompassing the Brehon law of Ireland, also referred to here as Patrick's law. pronounced judgment on the killer Nuada, who was condemned to death, though his soul went to Heaven.

Thus was the earliest judgement on the conflicting values of Christian and pagan laws in Ireland.

Saint Odran's feast-day is 19 February.

Due to the similarity of the name some people have identified Odran with Odhran of Iona. There is a link in the tradition that both men voluntarily sacrificed themselves in assisting the work of a greater saint.

Explanatory notes

References
 Citations 

 Sources 

 Binchy, D. A. (1975–76), "The Pseudo-historical prologue to the Senchas Mar" in Studia Celtica'' x/xi, p. 15.
 
 
 
 McCone, K. R. (1986)“Dubthach maccu Lugair and a Matter of Life and Death in the Pseudohistorical Prologue to the Senchas Már” in Peritia v.
 
 Full text available in four parts via TITUS @ University of Frankfurt
 
 

5th-century Christian saints
Medieval Irish saints
5th-century Irish people
5th-century Christian martyrs